Clavulina tepurumenga is a species of fungus in the family Clavulinaceae. Found in Guyana, it was described as new to science in 2010.

References

External links

Fungi described in 2010
Fungi of Guyana
tepurumenga